Center Village is an unincorporated community in Harlem Township, Delaware County, in the U.S. state of Ohio.

History
Variant names were Center, Centre Village, and Centerville. Center Village was laid out in 1848, and named for its location near the geographical center of Harlem Township. A post office called Centre Village was established in 1851, the name was changed to Center Village in 1893, and the post office closed in 1907.

References

Unincorporated communities in Delaware County, Ohio
Unincorporated communities in Ohio